Lasiolepturges zikani is a species of beetle in the family Cerambycidae, the only species in the genus Lasiolepturges.

References

Acanthocinini